Ballinamore Seán O'Heslin's Gaelic Athletic Association is a Gaelic football, hurling and ladies' Gaelic football club based in Ballinamore, County Leitrim, Republic of Ireland.

History
The club was founded as Ballinamore in January 1889 in McGauran’s Railway Hotel. Unusually for a County Leitrim club, they have always fielded teams in both hurling and Gaelic football.

Local schoolteacher Seán O'Heslin was a driving force behind the club in its early years; he died in 1942; Sean O’Heslin Memorial Park opened in 1952 and the club was renamed Ballinamore Seán O'Heslin's in his honour in 1953.

The club won twenty one Leitrim Senior Football Championships between 1913 and 2021, but have not won it since; they last reached the final in 2021 where they won . O'Heslin's also reached the final of the Connacht Senior Club Football Championship on four occasions — 1968, 1973, 1986 and 1990 — losing each time.

A ladies' Gaelic football team was founded in 2003. Camogie has been occasionally played, around 1917, revived in 1945–50 and again in the late 1990s; there is at present no camogie team.

Honours

Gaelic football
 Leitrim Senior Football Championship (21): 1913, 1922, 1930, 1933, 1935, 1936, 1939, 1956, 1964, 1967, 1968, 1969, 1972, 1973, 1975, 1979, 1982, 1986, 1988, 1990, 2021
 Leitrim Senior Football League (12): 1967, 1968, 1970, 1971, 1972, 1977, 1978, 1979, 1980, 1982, 1988, 1989
 Leitrim Junior Football Championship (3): 1933, 1939, 1997
 Leitrim Under-21 Football Championship (7): 1972, 1979, 1987, 2005, 2006, 2008, 2009 (2005–09 as Oughteragh Gaels, a union with Aughnasheelin)
 Leitrim Minor Football Championship (24): 1929, 1935, 1946, 1947, 1949, 1952, 1958 1959, 1960, 1961, 1968, 1969, 1974, 1976, 1977, 1978, 1984, 1985, 1993, 2002, 2006, 2011, 2014, 2017 (1993–2006 as Oughteragh Gaels, a union with Aughnasheelin; 2014 as St. Felim's, a union with Aughavas)

Ladies' football
 Leitrim Intermediate Ladies' Football Championship (1): 2014 (as Oughteragh Gaels, a union with Aughnasheelin)

Hurling
 Leitrim Senior Hurling Championship (3): 1971, 1987, 2015 (1971 as St Bridget’s, a union with Aughnasheelin)
 Leitrim Minor Hurling Championship (13): 1967, 1971, 1985, 1987, 1988, 1991, 1992, 1993, 1994, 2008, 2009, 2013, 2014 (1971 as St Bridget’s, a union with Aughnasheelin)

References

External links
Official website

Gaelic games clubs in County Leitrim
Gaelic football clubs in County Leitrim
Hurling clubs in County Leitrim
Ballinamore